Golui is a 2022 Bangladeshi government-granted romantic drama film directed by SA Haque Olike and produced by Khorshed Alam Khosru. The film stars Shakib Khan, Puja Cherry and Azizul Hakim in the lead roles. The cast also includes Fazlur Rahman Babu, Suchorita, Ali Raj, Jhuna Chowdhury, Somu Chowdhury in supporting roles. The shooting of the film was started on 20 September 2021 in the beautiful locations of Jamunachar in Jamalpur and Mirzapur in Tangail. The film was released on 3 May 2022 for the Eid-ul-Fitr.

Plot

Cast
 Shakib Khan as Lalu
 Puja Cherry as Mala
 Azizul Hakim
 Suchorita
 Fazlur Rahman Babu
 Ali Raj
 Jhuna Chowdhury
 Somu Chowdhury
 Md.Jasim Uddin

Production

Soundtrack
The film music album composed by Emon Saha and Imran Mahmudul. The background score produced by Emon Saha.

Track listing

References

External links 
 

2022 films
Bengali-language Bangladeshi films
2020s Bengali-language films
Films shot in Mymensingh Division
Government of Bangladesh grants films